Chafteh Darreh-ye Olya (also Romanized as Chafteh Darreh-ye ‘Olyā) is a village in Kakavand-e Sharqi Rural District, Kakavand District, Delfan County, Lorestan Province, Iran. At the 2006 census, its population was 58, in 12 families.

References 

Towns and villages in Delfan County